Strongylognathus chelifer is a species of ant in the genus Strongylognathus. It is endemic to Ukraine.

References

Strongylognathus
Insects of Europe
Endemic fauna of Ukraine
Insects described in 1985
Taxonomy articles created by Polbot